Cherry Grove is an unincorporated community located in Pendleton County, West Virginia, United States. Cherry Grove lies within the Monongahela National Forest at the confluence of Big Run with the North Fork South Branch Potomac River.

According to the Geographic Names Information System, Cherry Grove has also been known throughout its history as Big Run, Big Run School, Champe Rocks, Mullenax, Mullenun, and Mullenux. The present name is derived from the local Cherry Grove school.
	
Champe Rocks are located some 20 miles north of Cherry Grove and would not have been an alternate name.

Cherry Grove was the birthplace and hometown of WWII Medal of Honor Recipient, Clinton M. Hedrick.

References

Unincorporated communities in Pendleton County, West Virginia
Unincorporated communities in West Virginia